Eclipse Theia is a free and open-source framework for building IDEs and tools based on modern web technologies. Theia-based applications can be deployed as desktop and web applications. It is implemented in TypeScript, is based on Visual Studio Code, and emphasizes extensibility.

History 
Theia was originally developed by TypeFox and Ericsson, and continually receives contributions from EclipseSource, Red Hat, IBM, Google, Arm Holdings as well as from individual contributors. It was first launched in March 2017. Since May 2018, Theia has been a project of the Eclipse Foundation.

About 
Theia is built on the Language Server Protocol (LSP) and supports a variety of programming languages. It can be used as a desktop application, a web application, or a hybrid application with separate front and back ends. All of Theia's features are implemented as extensions, which allows third-party developers to modify Theia's functionality by using the same application programming interfaces (APIs) as the application's default components. Theia's layout consists of draggable docks.

Theia is a free and open-source software project under the Eclipse Foundation and is licensed under the Eclipse Public License 2.0 (EPL2).

Usage
Eclipse Che uses Eclipse Theia as its default IDE starting from version 7.

In September 2018, the online IDE Gitpod was released which was based on Theia.
(In 2021, Gitpod switched to Visual Studio Code.)

Arduino IDE 2.0 is based on Eclipse Theia, replacing the Processing-based IDE.

Reception 
In January 2019, JAXenter, a website and blog about coding, ranked Theia as the third-most popular JavaScript integrated development environment of 2018 according to GitHub metrics, behind Visual Studio Code and Atom.

References 

2017 software
Free and open-source software
Integrated development environments